is a Japanese footballer currently playing as a forward for  club Roasso Kumamoto.

Career statistics

Club
.

Honours
 Individual
J2 League Best XI: 2022

References

External links

Profile at Roasso Kumamoto

1998 births
Living people
Sportspeople from Saitama Prefecture
Association football people from Saitama Prefecture
Kokushikan University alumni
Japanese footballers
Association football forwards
J1 League players
J2 League players
J3 League players
Roasso Kumamoto players
Urawa Red Diamonds players